Doreen Rogers is a former camogie player, captain of the All Ireland Camogie Championship winning team in 1944 and 1949.

Career
A prolific goalscorer throughout her career, she won further All Ireland senior medals in 1942 when she scored two of Dublin's four goals in the final and 1943 when she scored three of Dublin's eight goals, against Cork in each case.

Club exploits
She scored a goal for Austin Stacks in their breakthrough Dublin Championship victory over Optimists by 3-4 to 0–1 in 1945, and four goals for Austin Stacks when they beat Coláiste San Dominic by 7-0 to 6–1 in 1948.
Her daughter also Doreen scored the second of Naomh Aoife's four goals in their 4-1 to 0-1 championship final breakthrough victory over Celtic in 1966.

References

External links
 Camogie.ie Official Camogie Association Website
 Wikipedia List of Camogie players

Dublin camogie players
Year of birth missing
Possibly living people